Senator McKenna may refer to:

Dale McKenna (1937–2009), Wisconsin State Senate
Edward B. McKenna (1883–1942), Michigan State Senate
Ryan McKenna (politician) (born 1973), Missouri State Senate
William McKenna (born 1946), Missouri State Senate

See also
John T. McKennan (1918–2011), New York State Senate